Renilla is a genus of sea pen. It is the only genus within the monotypic family Renillidae.

Species
The following species are recognized:

 Renilla amethystina Verrill, 1864
 Renilla koellikeri Pfeffer, 1886
 Renilla muelleri Kölliker, 1872
 Renilla musaica Zamponi & Pérez, 1996
 Renilla octodentata Zamponi & Pérez, 1996
 Sea pansy (Renilla reniformis) (Pallas, 1766)
 Renilla tentaculata Zamponi, Perez & Capitali, 1996

References 

Renillidae
Octocorallia genera
Bioluminescent cnidarians